Etone College (formerly Etone Community School and Technology College) is a secondary academy school in Nuneaton, Warwickshire, England. It was founded in 1910 as the Nuneaton High School for Girls, and is now a mixed school.

History

Nuneaton High School for Girls was founded in 1910 with the strong support of the Director of Education Bolton King. The founding head was (later Dame) Emmeline Mary Tanner who would go on to shape the 1944 Education Act.

The school was the grammar school for girls passing the eleven plus exam. However, after the abolition of the tripartite system, the school became mixed sex and changed its name to 'Etone Community School'. In 2002, the school was granted Technology College status under the specialist schools programme. In 2006, the school established a loose federation with another local school, Hartshill School to share resources and expertise. It also gained specialist Language and Vocational College status in 2006 and 2007 respectively. On 1 January 2012 the school officially gained academy status

In March 2015 the school came out 15 months of "special measures" after achieving a rating of "good" by Ofsted, and now is seen as one of the best schools in the Nuneaton and Warwickshire area.

Etone College has four houses and they have different tie colours. Griffin house have a gold tie, Phoenix house have a red tie, Dragon house have a purple house and Centaur house have a blue tie.

Radio 1
In early 2007, the school was paid a visit by Radio 1, as part of its Star Pupil feature. Presenter Edith Bowman broadcast live from the school and introduced pop singers Paolo Nutini and Jamelia performing live in the school's main hall.

Notable former pupils

Etone Community School

Etone College
 Saffiya Vorajee , Co-Director of The Azaylia Foundation opened in 2021.

Nuneaton High School for Girls
 Dame Janet Gaymer, Commissioner for Public Appointments for England, Wales and Northern ireland from 2006–10
 Caroline Graham, playwright, whose 1988 Inspector Barnaby books became ITV's Midsomer Murders in 1997
 Prof Rebecca Posner, Professor of the Romance Languages from 1978-96 at the University of Oxford (St Hugh's College), President from 1996-2000 of the Philological Society

References

External links
 Etone Website
 Ofsted Report

Academies in Warwickshire
Secondary schools in Warwickshire
Nuneaton